Reza Torabian (born 28 June 1971 in ) is a retired Iranian footballer and coach who was most recently the assistant manager at Persepolis.

External links 
 Torabian stats at standard.be
 

1971 births
Living people
Iranian footballers
Iran international footballers
Iranian expatriate footballers
Expatriate footballers in Singapore
Expatriate footballers in Belgium
Persepolis F.C. players
Balestier Khalsa FC players
Standard Liège players
Pas players
Azadegan League players
Singapore Premier League players
Belgian Pro League players
Persian Gulf Pro League players
Persepolis F.C. non-playing staff
Association football defenders
Iranian expatriate sportspeople in Belgium
People from Ray, Iran